Kwadwo/Kwadjo/Kojo (Kwadwo in Ghana) is an Akan masculine given name originating from the Akan people, meaning born on a Monday. As an Akan given name, with the Akans being a large ethnic group consisting of various tribes such as the Fante, Asante, Akuapem among others, Kwadwo/Kwadjo is sometimes written as "Kojo", Kwadwo or Kwadjo and is also used less frequently as a family name (see Akan name). People born on particular days are supposed to exhibit the characteristics or attributes and philosophy, associated with the days. Kwadwo has the appellation Okoto or Asera meaning peace. Thus, males named Kwodwo tend to be peaceful.

Origin and Meaning of Kwadwo 
In the Akan culture, day names are known to be derived from deities. Kwadwo originated from  Koyayuda and the Lord of Life Firmament deity of the day Monday.  Males named Kwadwo tend to be nurturing and achieve a balance between strength and compassion.

Male variants of Kwadwo 
Day names in Ghana vary in spelling among the various Akan subgroups.  The name is spelt Kwadwo by the Akuapem and Ashanti subgroups while the Fante subgroup spell it as Kwadjo, Kodwo, Cudjoe, Jojo or Kojo.

Female version of Kwadwo 
In the Akan culture and other local cultures in Ghana, day names come in pairs for males and females. The variant of the name used for a female child born on Monday is Adwoa.

Notable people with the name Kwadwo 
Most Ghanaian children have their cultural day names in combination with their English or Christian names. Some notable people with such names are:
Kwadwo Adjei-Darko, Ghanaian politician and former Minister for Mines
Kwadwo Afari-Gyan (born 1945), Ghanaian political scientist and election administrator
Kwadwo Ani (born 1966), Ghanaian painter
Kwadwo Asamoah (born 1988), Ghanaian footballer playing for Juventus
Kwadwo Baah Wiredu (1952–2008), Ghanaian politician
Kwadwo Boakye Djan, organiser of the 1979 Ghanaian coup
Kwadwo Osseo-Asare, Ghanaian-born American materials scientist 
Kwadwo Poku (born 1985), Ghanaian footballer playing in Denmark
Kwadwo Poku (born 1992), Ghanaian footballer
Osei Kwadwo, late-16th century Ashanti king
Yasmin Kwadwo (born 1990), German sprint athlete

References 

Ashanti given names
Akan given names
Masculine given names